Herbault is a commune in the French department of Loir-et-Cher, region of Centre-Val de Loire, France.

Population

See also
Communes of the Loir-et-Cher department

References

Communes of Loir-et-Cher